Gaulo is a town in the Sool region of Somaliland/Somalia. From 1909 until 1910, Gaulo was the capital of the Darawiish.

See also
Administrative divisions of Somaliland
Regions of Somaliland
Districts of Somaliland
Somalia–Somaliland border

References

Populated places in Sool, Somaliland